At Peace with Woman is the second album by The Jones Girls. Released in 1980, the album reached number seven on the Top Soul Albums chart.

Track listing
"Children of the Night" (Linda Creed, Thom Bell) 5:11 		
"Let's Celebrate (Sittin' on Top of the World)" (Cynthia Biggs, Dexter Wansel, Lou Rawls, Teddy Pendergrass) 4:19  	
"Dance Turned into a Romance" (Kenny Gamble, Leon Huff) 4:29
"I Close My Eyes" (Cynthia Biggs, Dexter Wansel) 4:56	 	
"At Peace With Woman" (James Herb Smith, Joel Bryant, Kenneth Gamble) 4:31	 	
"When I'm Gone" (Cynthia Biggs, Dexter Wansel) 4:49	 	
"I Just Love The Man" (Kenny Gamble, Leon Huff) 4:40 	
"Back in the Day" (Kenny Gamble, Leon Huff) 3:58

Personnel
Shirley Jones - Lead vocals (1, 2, 3, 5, 6, 7, 8), backing vocals
Brenda Jones - Lead vocals (1, 4, 5, 6), backing vocals
Valorie Jones - Lead vocals (1, 5, 6), backing vocals
Dexter Wansel – keyboards, synthesizer, percussion
Leon Huff, John L. Usry Jr., Joel Bryant – keyboards 
James Williams, Larry Moore, Derrick Graves – bass
Quinton Joseph, Clifford "Pete" Rudd – drums
Dennis Harris, James Herb Smith, Marc Rubin – guitar
Miguel Fuentes – percussion
Steve Green – sea bass
Al Harrison – trumpet
Robert Malach, Ralph Olsen – saxophone
Don Renaldo – horns, strings
Bill Lacy, Diane Evans, James Herb Smith, Joel Bryant – handclaps

Charts

Singles

References

External links
 The Jones Girls-At Peace with Woman at Discogs

1980 albums
The Jones Girls albums
Philadelphia International Records albums
Albums produced by Kenneth Gamble
Albums produced by Leon Huff
Albums recorded at Sigma Sound Studios